These are the results of the women's K-1 slalom competition in canoeing at the 2004 Summer Olympics.  The K-1 (kayak single) event is raced by one-man kayaks through a whitewater course.  The venue for the 2004 Olympic competition was the Olympic Canoe/Kayak Slalom Centre at the Helliniko Olympic Complex.

Medalists

Results
The 19 competitors each took two preliminary runs through the whitewater slalom course.  The top 15 kayakers by combined time from the two runs advanced to the semifinal.  The top 10 times from the single semifinal run determined the finalists.  Ranking and medals are based on the combined time of the semifinal run and the final run.  The preliminary runs were raced on August 17 and the semifinal and final runs were on August 18.

References
2004 Summer Olympics Canoe slalom results 
Sports-reference.com 2004 women's slalom K-1 results
Yahoo! Sports Athens 2004 Summer Olympics Canoe/Kayak Results

Women's Slalom K-1
Olymp
Women's events at the 2004 Summer Olympics